The Metropolitan Law Enforcement Council sometimes called "MetroLEC," is a regional mutual aid facilitator formed by 45 police agencies in the area near Boston, Massachusetts. It pools resources to provide SWAT, canine, hostage negotiation, computer crimes, motorcycle and other units throughout the area. Its fleet includes at least one armored car and a mobile command post. Press reports indicated that in 2016 it used its SWAT unit twenty-six times. MetroLEC, like other such agencies such as the North Eastern Massachusetts Law Enforcement Council, claims it is a private organization and exempt from open records laws.

The group was established sometime before 2004. Richard Stillman, the Walpole chief of police served as the group's president for ten years. By 2017, Canton Police Chief Ken Berkowitz was the group's leader. In 2020, the chief of the Norton Police Department was serving as president of the group.

Agencies that belong to MetroLEC include:

Abington Police Department
Attleboro Police Department
Avon Police Department
Bellingham Police Department
Braintree Police Department
Canton Police Department
Cohasset Police Department
Dedham Police Department
Dover Police Department
Duxbury Police Department
Easton Police Department
Foxborough Police Department
Franklin Police Department
Hanover Police Department
Hingham Police Department
Holbrook Police Department
Mansfield Police Department
Medfield Police Department
Medway Police Department
Millis Police Department
Milton Police Department
Natick Police Department
Needham Police Department

Norfolk Police Department
Norton Police Department
Norwell Police Department
Norwood Police Department
Pembroke Police Department
Plainville Police Department
Randolph Police Department
Rockland Police Department
Sharon Police Department
Stoughton Police Department
Sudbury Police Department
Walpole Police Department
Wayland Police Department
Wellesley Police Department
Weston Police Department
Westwood Police Department
Weymouth Police Department
Wrentham Police Department
Bristol County Sheriff's Office
Norfolk County Sheriff's Office
Plymouth County Sheriff's Office
 Fallon Ambulance Service Tactical Paramedic Unit

References

Law enforcement in Massachusetts